Mindaugas Lukauskis aka "The Legend", "Iron man", (born May 19, 1979) is a Lithuanian professional basketball player for BC Wolves of the Lithuanian Basketball League. Lukauskis is a holder of multiple Lithuanian League records.

Professional career
Lukauskis began his basketball career in the Panevežys youth basketball clubs, being the leader there. He got attention from the LKL, and in 2001, he joined Sakalai. In 2002, he signed a one-year contract with Alytus, and he was the top scorer on the team. In 2003, he joined Lithuanian basketball giant Lietuvos Rytas. In 2006, Lukauskis improved his game and alongside Tomas Delininkaitis he gave Rytas a strong impact off the bench. In the 2007 season, he became a starting player.

In the EuroCup Final 8 on April 4, 2009, Lukauskis made a decisive, game-winning, 10 meters distance three-pointer and that allowed him to become the only player to participate in the EuroCup Final three times in total. He then went on to become the only two-time EuroCup champion. In July 2009, he joined the French League club ASVEL. In September 2010 he signed with the German EuroCup-Team Baskets Oldenburg.

After spending a season with Italy's Barcellona Sigma of Legadue, in September 2012 Lukauskis moved to Valencia Basket of the Liga ACB, replacing the injured Thomas Kelati.

On August 7, 2016, Lukauskis signed with his hometown club Lietkabelis Panevėžys.

On July 19, 2017, he returned to Lietuvos rytas Vilnius for his ninth season as the club member. During the 2018 Karaliaus Mindaugo taurė, Lukauskis being 38 years old surprisingly became the LKL Three-point Shootout champion. On August 25, 2018, Lukauskis signed with BC Prienai of the Lithuanian Basketball League.

On October 15, 2020, Lukauskis signed with BC Šiauliai until the end of the season.

On August 19, 2021, Lukauskis signed with Dzūkija Alytus. On September 19, 2021, at 42 years and 123 days of age, Lukauskis became the oldest player to appear in a game in the Lithuanian Basketball League history, surpassing the previous record set by Algimantas Pavilonis in 1996. On December 6, 2021, Lukauskis scored a career-high 33 points in a game against Nevėžis Kėdainiai, breaking his previous scoring record set in 2001. He finished the season averaging 11.9 points, 4.1 rebounds, 1.6 assists and 1.2 steals in 34 LKL games played.

On August 9, 2022, Lukauskis signed with BC Wolves of the Lithuanian Basketball League.

National team career
Lukauskis was a member of the senior Lithuanian national team at the 2008 Summer Olympics in Beijing. On August 16, 2008, when Lithuania played against Croatia in the Olympics, Lukauskis helped Lithuania to win the game, by scoring 20 points.

Career statistics

EuroLeague

|-
| style="text-align:left;"|2005–06
| style="text-align:left;" rowspan="2"|Lietuvos Rytas
| 19 || 0 || 14.4 || .380 || .361 || .652 || 3.2 || .8 || .8 || .1 || 4.3 || 5.1
|-
| style="text-align:left;"|2007–08
| 20 || 18 || 23.3 || .423 || .365 || .744 || 2.6 || 2.1 || 1.5 || .1 || 8.4 || 8.2
|-
| style="text-align:left;"|2009–10
| style="text-align:left;"|ASVEL
| 10 || 10 || 30.1 || .469 || .273 || .800 || 2.0 || 3.1 || 2.3 || .3 || 8.1 || 11.1
|-class="sortbottom"
| style="text-align:center;" colspan="2"|Career
| 49 || 28 || 21.5 || .423 || .343 || .728 || 2.7 || 1.8 || 1.4 || .1 || 6.8 || 7.6

Awards and achievements
 Baltic League President's Cup Winner: 2008
 2× LKF Cup Winner: 2009, 2014
 2× ULEB Cup (EuroCup) Champion: 2005, 2009
 3× Baltic League Champion: 2006, 2007, 2009
 2× LKL League Champion: 2006, 2009
 Match des champions Winner: 2009
 Semaine de As Cup Winner: 2010

References

External links
 Euroleague.net Profile
 TBLStat.net Profile
 Eurobasket.com Profile

1979 births
Living people
ASVEL Basket players
Basketball players at the 2008 Summer Olympics
BC Dzūkija players
BC Lietkabelis players
BC Prienai players
BC Rytas players
BC Šiauliai players
BC Wolves players
Bilbao Basket players
EWE Baskets Oldenburg players
Liga ACB players
Lithuanian expatriate basketball people in France
Lithuanian expatriate basketball people in Germany
Lithuanian expatriate basketball people in Spain
Lithuanian expatriate basketball people in Turkey
Lithuanian men's basketball players
Olympic basketball players of Lithuania
Shooting guards
Small forwards
Sportspeople from Panevėžys
Tofaş S.K. players
Valencia Basket players